Jorge Vásquez (9 May 1922 – 26 September 2017) was a Chilean footballer. He played in five matches for the Chile national football team in 1945. He was also part of Chile's squad for the 1945 South American Championship.

References

External links
 

1922 births
2017 deaths
Chilean footballers
Chile international footballers
Place of birth missing
Association football defenders
Colo-Colo footballers